Michael Steinbach (born 3 September 1969, in Ueberlingen) is a retired German rower who won a gold medal at the 1992 Barcelona Olympics.

References

Rowers at the 1992 Summer Olympics
Olympic rowers of Germany
Olympic gold medalists for Germany
1969 births
Living people
Olympic medalists in rowing
German male rowers
Medalists at the 1992 Summer Olympics
People from Überlingen
Sportspeople from Tübingen (region)